Acrobasis mienshani is a species of snout moth in the genus Acrobasis. It was described by Aristide Caradja in 1939. It is found in China.

References

Moths described in 1939
Acrobasis
Moths of Asia
Taxa named by Aristide Caradja